ThunderPad Digital is a game controller by computer peripherals company Logitech. The drivers only supports Windows 95 to Windows 98 and will not work on Windows XP or later operating systems. The button outlay is a look-alike to the Super Nintendo Entertainment System controller.

Specifications 
 8 bindable buttons
 8 way directional pad, so called D-pad
 15-pin game controller/MIDI connector
 "Logitech Entertainment Control Center" drivers for bindings and such

System requirements 
 IBM PC with an i386 CPU or higher
 DOS 5.0 or higher (Windows 95 recommended)
 15-pin game controller/MIDI connector port
 CD-ROM drive for the driver disk

Thunderpad Digital
Computer peripherals